Nail is a given name. Notable people with the name include:

 Nail Bakirov (1952–2010), Russian statistician and professor
 Nail Beširović (born 1967), Bosnian retired footballer
 Nail Çakırhan (1910–2008), Turkish poet, journalist, architect and house restorer
 Nail Galimov (born 1966), Russian football coach and former player
 Nail Magzhanov (born 1980), Russian former footballer
 Nail Minibayev (born 1985), Russian former footballer
 Nail Yakupov (born 1993), Russian National Hockey League player
 Nail Zamaliyev (born 1989), Russian footballer

Fictional
 Nail, a minor protagonist of Dragon Ball Z

Turkic masculine given names